Perittia secutrix is a moth of the family Elachistidae. It is found in South Africa.

The wingspan is 11–13 mm. The forewings are ochreous-whitish and the hindwings are pale greyish.

References

Endemic moths of South Africa
Elachistidae
Moths described in 1914
Moths of Africa